Prince Octopus Dzanie (born 26 March 1985) is a Ghanaian professional boxer. As an amateur, he represented Ghana at the 2008 Olympics.

References

1985 births
Living people
Featherweight boxers
Olympic boxers of Ghana
Boxers at the 2008 Summer Olympics
Ghanaian male boxers